Roland Dickgießer (born 9 November 1960) is a German former professional footballer who played as a defender.

References

External links
 

1960 births
Living people
German footballers
Association football defenders
Germany under-21 international footballers
Bundesliga players
2. Bundesliga players
SV Waldhof Mannheim players
Olympic footballers of West Germany
West German footballers
Footballers at the 1984 Summer Olympics
German football managers
SV Waldhof Mannheim managers
TSG 1899 Hoffenheim managers
People from Bruchsal
Sportspeople from Karlsruhe (region)
Footballers from Baden-Württemberg